David Wilson (born 23 April 1957) is a Scottish emeritus professor of criminology at Birmingham City University. A former prison governor, he is well known as a criminologist specialising in serial killers through his work with various British police forces, academic publications, books and media appearances.

Early life
Born in Sauchie, Clackmannanshire, Scotland, David Wilson was raised on a dairy farm outside Carluke, South Lanarkshire, Scotland. He studied at the University of Glasgow (1975–79), Selwyn College, Cambridge, and at the Cambridge Institute of Criminology, where he gained a PhD in 1983. He was awarded the St Andrew's Scholarship of New York, 1979–80. and became a National Teaching Fellow in 2012.

Career

Her Majesty's Prison Service
Recruited directly from Cambridge, he joined Her Majesty's Prison Service as an Assistant Governor at HMP Wormwood Scrubs in 1984. It is said by some that at the age of 29 he became the youngest governor in the country. In fact he was the Assistant Governor in charge of Finnamore Wood camp, a small annexe to HM YOI Huntercombe. He then worked at HMP Grendon where he ran the sex offenders' treatment programme, HMP Woodhill, and HMYOI Finnamore Wood.

While at HMP Woodhill, Wilson helped design and managed the two units for the 12 most disruptive prisoners in the country. This experience brought him into contact with some of the most notorious offenders of the last 30 years, including Charles Bronson and Dennis Nilsen.

Latterly he was Head of Prison Officer and Operational Training in the Prison Service, on whose behalf he made official visits to Northern Ireland and the United States. It was after he returned from a trip to advise on penal reform in Albania on behalf of the Council of Europe, and, noticing how much better the prisons were there, that he resigned from Her Majesty's Prison Service in protest at prison conditions. In 2001 he completed a report of the 4,200 Muslim prisoners in British jails and his review concluded there were no examples of extremist recruiting.

Wilson has written about these experiences in his memoir, My Life with Murderers.

Professor of Criminology
After a short time with the Prison Reform Trust, Wilson joined University of Central England in Birmingham (now Birmingham City University),  was given a professorship in 2000 and made Emeritus Professor in 2017. A member of the British Society of Criminology, his research covers aspects of prisons and imprisonment, murder and serial murder.

Wilson has advised various police forces as a criminologist, and in 2006 was also involved in the Ipswich serial murder case, as an advisor to Sky News.  Subsequently, Steve Wright was arrested and prosecuted for this series of murders. Wilson co-authored a book with the former Sky broadcast journalist Paul Harrison about their experiences on this case. Wilson also approached convicted murderer Peter Tobin to discuss the Bible John killings, but did not secure a meeting with Tobin. 

Wilson acted as: Vice-Chair of the Howard League for Penal Reform (1998–2014); Vice-President of New Bridge; and Chair of the Forum on Prisoner Education (2000–2006). He is a former Chair of the Commission on English Prisons Today, whose president was Cherie Blair, and of the Friends of Grendon Prison. In 2012, he was made a National Teaching Fellow of England and Wales.

Writing
Wilson has published widely on the criminal justice system generally and prisons specifically, and was the Editor of the Howard Journal of Criminal Justice (2000–2015), and is the author of more than 15 books.

Media
Wilson appears regularly on television and radio, both as a commentator about the criminal justice system and as a presenter. He is a regular contributor to the press and writes mostly for The Guardian and the Daily Mail. On television he presented four series of The Crime Squad for BBC1, and also Leave No Trace and Too Young to Die? about the plight of young people on death row in the USA. On BBC2 he presented Who Killed Ivan the Terrible? and was an expert on the game show Identity. On Channel 5 he co-presented Banged Up, which was nominated for a Royal Television Society award. Wilson developed and presented two series of Killers Behind Bars: The Untold Story, which was developed initially from the stand point of an academic look at criminal profiling to counter that shown in fictional series such as CSI: Crime Scene Investigation. In 2016, he presented the critically acclaimed  Interview with a Murderer on Channel 4, about the murder of Carl Bridgewater. This documentary won the Broadcast Award and the Royal Television Society Award in 2017. By 2021, Wilson had presented 2 series of the true crime show, David Wilson's Crime Files. Both series had 10 episodes, with episodes in the first series being an hour long and episodes in the second series being half an hour long. It was broadcast on BBC Scotland. 

Wilson appeared on BBC Radio 4's Ramblings series on 1 October 2020, walking with Clare Balding from Wicken, Northamptonshire to Leckhampstead, Buckinghamshire whilst discussing his life.

Wilson gives public lectures and delivers lectures for schools through the company CrimiKnowledge. In 2016 the TV drama Dark Angel attributed his book Mary Ann Cotton: Britain's First Female Serial Killer as its inspiration.

Personal life
Wilson is married to Anne, a practising lawyer. The couple live in Buckinghamshire and have two children.

Publications (books)
 
 
 

 – This co-author is the Sky broadcast journalist and not the former Police Officer of the same name.
 – This co-author is the Sky broadcast journalist and not the former Police Officer of the same name.

References

External links 

Professor David Wilson website
David Wilson BCU home page
Articles at The Guardian newspaper

BBC News article

1957 births
Living people
People from Clackmannanshire
Alumni of the University of Glasgow
Alumni of Selwyn College, Cambridge
British prison governors
Academics of Birmingham City University
British criminologists
Prison reformers
Scottish television personalities